Alan George Lance Sr. (born April 27, 1949) is an American attorney, politician, and jurist who serves as a Senior judge of the United States Court of Appeals for Veterans Claims. Lance previously served as the Idaho Attorney General and as a member of the Idaho House of Representatives.

Early life and education 
Al Lance was born on April 27, 1949, in McComb, Ohio. He received his Bachelor of Arts degree from South Dakota State University in 1971 and his Juris Doctor from the University of Toledo College of Law in 1973. From 1974 to 1978, he served as a junior officer in the 172d Infantry Brigade and at Corpus Christi Army Depot, receiving the Army Commendation Medal in 1977.

Career 
Lance began his legal career as an Assistant Prosecuting Attorney for Fulton County, Ohio. In 1978, Lance moved with his family to Meridian, Idaho, where he became involved with his local chapter of the American Legion.

Lance was elected to the Idaho House of Representatives in 1990 and served as Majority Caucus Chairman during his second term in office, from 1993 to 1995. He was elected Attorney General of Idaho in 1994, serving from 1995 to 2003, Idaho's longest-serving Attorney General at that time. While serving as Attorney General, he also served on the Executive Committee of the National Association of Attorneys General and as the Chairman of the Conference of Western Attorneys General.

He joined the Court of Appeals on December 16, 2004, after being nominated by President George W. Bush. Prior to that, Lance served as the National Commander of the American Legion from 1999 to 2000. He served as the 31st Attorney General of Idaho from 1995 to 2003 and was a member of the Idaho House of Representatives from 1990 to 1994.

Upon his retirement, Lance assumed senior status as a recall-eligible retired judge.

See also 

List of people from Ohio
List of University of Toledo people

References

External links 
 Alan Lance Sr. at ballotpedia.org

Biography at U.S. Court of Appeals for Veterans Claims

1949 births
Living people
21st-century American judges
Idaho Attorneys General
Idaho lawyers
Judges of the United States Court of Appeals for Veterans Claims
Members of the Idaho House of Representatives
National Commanders of the American Legion
Ohio lawyers
People from Hancock County, Ohio
South Dakota State University alumni
University of Toledo alumni
University of Toledo College of Law alumni
United States Army officers
United States Article I federal judges appointed by George W. Bush